Nancy S. Wyman (born April 21, 1946) is an American Democratic Party politician who was the 108th lieutenant governor of Connecticut, from 2011 to 2019. She was state comptroller of Connecticut from 1995 to 2011, and was the first woman elected to that office since it was created in 1786. She served as the Chairwoman of the Connecticut Democratic Party from 2019 to 2020.

Early life
Wyman was born to a Jewish family and grew up in Brooklyn, New York, where her father worked as an accountant and supplemented his income by delivering the New York Daily News. She earned an associate degree in radiological technology from Long Island College Hospital.

Early career
Wyman began her career in public service as vice chairperson of the Tolland Board of Education. She served in this post for four years, but was on the board serving in other roles for five additional years. In 1986, she was elected as the State Representative from the 53rd district of Connecticut, serving in this capacity from 1987–1995.

Comptroller (1995–2011)
In 1994, Wyman became State Comptroller upon defeating Republican Gene Gavin, a Certified Public Accountant. She succeeded William E. Curry Jr., who did not run for re-election in order to run for governor.

As comptroller, Wyman was the chief fiscal guardian for the State of Connecticut. She oversaw the state health plan for 200,000 state employees, retirees, and their dependents.

Despite the high popularity of Connecticut's last two Republican governors, Wyman has easily won re-election. In 1998 she was challenged by Republican State Representative Christopher R. Scalzo. In 2002, 28-year-old West Haven Republican Justice of the Peace and City Commissioner Steven Mullins presented an easy challenge to Wyman.

Mullins, a real estate manager by profession, was chosen by then-Governor John G. Rowland to challenge Wyman the week of the state Republican Convention. He is the only African-American nominee for state comptroller, Democrat or Republican, in Connecticut history.

After being endorsed by three of Connecticut's major newspapers, seven term Groton Republican State Senator Cathy Cook lost to Wyman in 2006.

Lieutenant Governor (2011–2019)
Democratic candidate for Governor Dan Malloy chose Wyman to be his running mate in the 2010 gubernatorial race. After defeating primary opponent Mary Glassman on August 10, 2010, Wyman became the official 2010 Democratic candidate for Lieutenant Governor. Malloy and Wyman won a narrow general election.

Wyman was sworn in on January 5, 2011, succeeding Republican Michael Fedele. She was succeeded by former Secretary of State Susan Bysiewicz on January 9, 2019.

Political advocacy
In 2006, Wyman co-chaired Joe Courtney's campaign for United States Congress against incumbent U.S. Representative Rob Simmons in Connecticut's second Congressional District. Courtney defeated Simmons by a narrow margin.

Issues
Wyman is liberal when it comes to social issues. In March 2007, she testified at a public hearing of the State Legislative Judiciary Committee in support of Bill #7395 – "An Act Concerning Marriage Equality." In her opening statement before the committee, she stated, "To violate the rights of a few is to violate the rights of all." The bill supports same-sex marriage rights in Connecticut. In 2008, same-sex marriage became legal in Connecticut by court order.

Personal life
Wyman is married to Tolland Democratic Registrar of Voters R. Michael Wyman. They have lived in Tolland since 1973.

Electoral history 

*Wyman was also nominated on the A Connecticut Party line.

See also
List of female lieutenant governors in the United States

References

External links
Official site of Lieutenant Governor Nancy Wyman

|-

|-

|-

1946 births
20th-century American politicians
20th-century American women politicians
21st-century American politicians
21st-century American women politicians
Connecticut Comptrollers
Jewish American state legislators in Connecticut
Jewish women politicians
Democratic Party members of the Connecticut House of Representatives
Lieutenant Governors of Connecticut
Living people
People from Tolland, Connecticut
School board members in Connecticut
Women state legislators in Connecticut
State political party chairs of Connecticut
21st-century American Jews